Orm (in Old Norse and in modern Danish, Swedish, Norwegian (bokmål and nynorsk) the word for "snake", "worm" or "dragon") became an Anglo-Saxon personal name during period of the Danelaw.  

Orm may also refer to:

 Orm or Ormin, the author of the Ormulum, a 12th century Christian text
 the commissioner of the Kirkdale sundial in 11th century England 
 the Ocean Master, a DC Comics supervillain and half-brother to Aquaman
 Orm, the name of a dragon (and part of the name of other dragons) in the Earthsea series
 Orm (given name), with a list of people with this name

ORM as an acronym may refer to:

 Object-relational mapping, a software programming technique that allows accessing relational databases in the form of abstract objects
 Object-role modeling, a method for conceptual data modeling
 Oak Ridges Moraine, a geological landform in Ontario, Canada
 Observatorio del Roque de los Muchachos, an observatory on the island of La Palma
 Online reputation management
 Online research methods
 Operational risk management, a concept for safety in operations planning and execution
 Oromo language of the Horn of Africa (ISO code: orm) 
 Orosomucoid, a glycoprotein 
 Outsourcing relationship management
 Sywell Aerodrome in Northamptonshire, England (IATA airport code)

See also

 ORM-D
 
 
 Orme (disambiguation) 
 Orn (disambiguation)